Janice Niemi (September 18, 1928 – October 21, 2020) was an American lawyer and politician who served in the Washington House of Representatives from the 43rd district from 1983 to 1987 and in the Washington State Senate from the 43rd district from 1987 to 1995.

She died on October 21, 2020, in Seattle, Washington at age 92.

References

1928 births
2020 deaths
Democratic Party members of the Washington House of Representatives
Democratic Party Washington (state) state senators
University of Washington alumni
University of Michigan alumni
Women state legislators in Washington (state)